Ryan Brown may refer to:

Musicians
 Ryan Brown (conductor) (born 1958), American conductor of Opera Lafayette
 Ryan Brown, American rock musician, member of Papa Roach
 Ryan Brown (born 1986), American musician, one of piano playing siblings The 5 Browns

Others
 Ryan Brown (actor) (born 1975), American actor
 Ryan Brown (comics) (born 1962), American comics artist
 Ryan Brown (footballer) (born 1985), English footballer
 Ryan J. Brown (born 1991), English actor and screenwriter

See also
 Ryan Browne, American comics artist